The Royal Hawaiian Band is the oldest and only full-time municipal band in the United States.  At present a body of the City & County of Honolulu, the Royal Hawaiian Band has been entertaining Honolulu residents and visitors since its inception in 1836 by Kamehameha III. During the monarchy it was nominally a military band. It reached global prominence under the leadership of Prussian Heinrich "Henri" Berger, an officer of the imperial German army loaned to the Kingdom of Hawaii in 1872.  Berger composed many beloved marching tunes and other melodies, and would later be honored with the title of "Father of Hawaiian Music." He collaborated with King Kalākaua in creating Hawaii Ponoi, the national anthem of Hawaii; it is still used today as the official state song.

During its long and distinguished history, the Royal Hawaiian band inspired the development of other brass bands in Hawaii, and possibly elsewhere in Polynesia and the Pacific. According to researcher Patrick Hennessey, the band may even be credited for originally introducing Hawaii's world-renowned song "Aloha 'Oe" to the United States mainland.

, the Royal Hawaiian Band is composed of 40 full-time musicians under the baton of Bandmaster Clarke Bright, previously conducted by Michael Nakasone. The band performs every Friday at noon on the grass grounds of the historic Iolani Palace in downtown Honolulu and on Sundays at two o'oclock at the Kapiolani Park Bandstand in Waikiki.

References

External links
 Royal Hawaiian Band
 David Bandy: Bandmaster Henry Berger and the Royal Hawaiian Band. In: Hawaiian Journal of History, Volume 24, 1990, pp. 69–90
 The Royal Hawaiian Band in U.S. Newspapers
 Aloha 'Oe, the Song at Pier 10 (A Tall Tale), by John Tanaka

Musical groups from Hawaii
Culture of Honolulu
1836 establishments in Hawaii
Tourist attractions in Honolulu
Government of Honolulu
Military of the Hawaiian Kingdom